Dodai ben Nahman (Hebrew : דודאי בן נחמן or Rav Dorai, Hebrew: רב דוראי) was a Babylonian-Jewish scholar of the 8th century and gaon of the Talmudic academy at Pumbedita (761–764). Little is known of his life. He was a brother of the famed Judah ben Nahman, gaon at Sura (759–762), and with him was instrumental in preventing the eventual founder of Karaism, Anan ben David from succeeding to the exilarchate made vacant by the death of Solomon ben Hasdai and Isaac Iskoy ben Solomon, Anan's kinsmen.

References
"Dodai ben Nahman". Ginzberg, Louis and S. Mendelsohn. Jewish Encyclopedia. Funk and Wagnalls, 1901–1906, which contains the following bibliography:
Sherira Gaon, Iggerot;
Grätz, Gesch. v. 176, 418;
Halevy, Dorot ha-Rishonim, iii. 81a, 102a.

Geonim
Iraqi Jews
8th-century rabbis
Rabbis of Academy of Pumbedita